Vilma Kathleen McNish (born January 16, 1957) is a Jamaican diplomat who was their ambassador to Belgium, Permanent Representative to the European Union and UNESCO as well as having served, from 2001 until 2005 as Ambassador to Mexico, Central America and High Commissioner to Belize.

Education
BSc (International Relations) UWI, Mona
M.A (International Affairs) Georgetown University, Washington D.C

References

Ambassadors of Jamaica to Belgium
Jamaican women ambassadors
1957 births
Georgetown University alumni
University of the West Indies alumni
High Commissioners of Jamaica to Belize
Ambassadors of Jamaica to Mexico
Permanent Delegates of Jamaica to UNESCO
European Union diplomats
Living people
Permanent Representatives of Jamaica to the European Union